The Rural Municipality of Kutawa No. 278 (2006 Population 221) was a rural municipality (RM) in Saskatchewan. It was dissolved on January 1, 2004.

Demographics

References 

Kutawa No. 278
Populated places disestablished in 2004